Jordan Richards (born 25 April 1993) is an English footballer who plays as a defender for Curzon Ashton.

Richards played in the Football League for Hartlepool United. He has also played non-league football for Alfreton Town, Darlington, AFC Fylde, Southport and Farsley Celtic.

Career
Richards was born in Sunderland, Tyne and Wear.

Hartlepool United
He started his career in the youth team of Hartlepool United on a two-year scholarship. He won the Youth Team Player of the Year Award for the 2010–11 season. In the summer of 2011, Richards signed his first professional contract. He made his professional debut on 20 March 2012, in a 1–0 defeat to Oldham Athletic, replacing Paul Murray as a late substitute. A month later, he was handed his first start playing the full 90 minutes against Tranmere Rovers in a 1–1 draw.

Jordan was praised by manager John Hughes after his run in the first-team, but was then dealt with the blow of being ruled out for the rest of the 2012–13 season due to a knee injury.

On 7 May 2014, Richards extended his contract with Pools.

Richards joined National League North side Alfreton Town on a one-month loan deal in February 2017, the deal was later extended until the end of the season. However in April 2017, newly appointed caretaker manager Matthew Bates recalled Richards to Hartlepool. At the end of the 2016-17 season, Richards was one of nine players released by the club.

AFC Fylde
After his release from Hartlepool, Richards signed for local rivals Darlington in August 2017. He left Darlington after only 11 days. The following week, Richards signed for National League side AFC Fylde. He made his debut in a 2-1 defeat to FC Halifax Town on 2 September 2017.

Richards made 14 appearances for Fylde in all competitions.

Southport
Richards joined National League North side Southport on a free transfer on 12 January 2018. Richards scored his first goal in senior football in August 2018, direct from a free-kick, for Southport in a 3–1 defeat to Altrincham.

Richards was released by Southport at the end of the 2018–19 season. He made 50 league appearances for the National League North club. During his time with Southport, Richards won both the Liverpool Senior Cup and Lancashire FA Challenge Trophy in the 2018–19 season.

Farsley Celtic
In July 2019, Richards signed for newly promoted National League North side Farsley Celtic. Richards was released from his contract by mutual agreement on 12 January 2022.

Curzon Ashton
Two days after departing Farsley Celtic, Richards signed for fellow National League North club Curzon Ashton. The move saw him link up with his former Farsley boss Adam Lakeland. Richards made his first appearance for Curzon on 15 January 2022, coming on as a substitute, against Kettering Town. Richards scored his first goal for the club against his former team Darlington in a 2-0 win on 15 April 2022.

Personal life
He is the nephew of former England international footballer Michael Gray.

Career statistics

References

External links

Jordan Richards' at Soccerway

1993 births
Living people
Footballers from Sunderland
English footballers
Association football defenders
Hartlepool United F.C. players
English Football League players
Alfreton Town F.C. players
Darlington F.C. players
AFC Fylde players
Southport F.C. players
Farsley Celtic F.C. players
Curzon Ashton F.C. players